Vermont Square Park is an urban park located in Los Angeles City Council District 9, Los Angeles, California. It features barbecue pits, basketball courts, and a children's playground.

References

Parks in California
Parks in Los Angeles County, California
Parks in Los Angeles